The Japan-U.S. Friendship Commission Prize for the Translation of Japanese Literature was established in 1979 and is administered by the Donald Keene Center of Japanese Culture at Columbia University. It is the oldest prize for Japanese literary translation in the United States.

Works entered into competition are judged on the literary merit of the translation and the accuracy with which it reflects the spirit of the Japanese original.

The Keene Center annually awards $6,000 in Japan-U.S. Friendship Commission Prizes for the Translation of Japanese Literature. A prize is given for the best translation of a modern work or a classical work, or the prize is divided between equally distinguished translations.

See also 
 Japan-United States Friendship Commission

External links 
More information about the prize, deadlines, and past winners

Translation awards
Japanese literary awards
Awards and prizes of Columbia University
1979 establishments in New York City